Interphotoreceptor matrix proteoglycan 1 is a protein that in humans is encoded by the IMPG1 gene.

References

Further reading